Julia is a usually feminine given name. It is a Latinate feminine form of the name Julio and Julius. (For further details on etymology, see the Wiktionary entry "Julius".) The given name Julia had been in use throughout Late Antiquity (e.g. Julia of Corsica) but became rare during the Middle Ages, and was revived only with the Italian Renaissance. It became common in the English-speaking world only in the 18th century. Today, it is frequently used throughout the world.

Statistics 
Julia was the 10th most popular name for girls born in the United States in 2007 and the 88th most popular name for women in the 1990 census there. It has been among the top 150 names given to girls in the United States for the past 100 years. It was the 89th most popular name for girls born in England and Wales in 2007; the 94th most popular name for girls born in Scotland in 2007; the 13th most popular name for girls born in Spain in 2006; the 5th most popular name for girls born in Sweden in 2007; the 94th most popular name for girls born in Belgium in 2006; the 53rd most popular name for girls born in Norway in 2007; the 70th most popular name for girls born in Hungary in 2005; the 19th most popular name for girls born in British Columbia, Canada in 2006; the 9th most popular name for girls born in Germany in 2005; the 2nd most popular name for girls born in Poland in 2013 and the most popular name in Austria.

The programming language Julia, is a rare one using a feminine name (the, likely, earliest one is Ada, another earlier is Ruby and later Crystal). The language Julia is however not named after (a specific) woman, while Ada is named after the programmer pioneer Ada Lovelace. Most languages aren't named after people, while e.g. Pascal and Haskell are named after men.

People

Ancient world
Julia (women of the Julii Caesares):
Julia (wife of Sulla) (c. 129 BC–c. 104 BC), first wife of Sulla
Julia (wife of Marius) (c. 130 BC–69 BC)
Julia (mother of Mark Antony) (104 BC–after 39 BC)
Julia Major (sister of Julius Caesar) (before 101 BC–?)
Julia Minor (sister of Julius Caesar) (101 BC–51 BC), maternal grandmother of Emperor Augustus Caesar
Julia (daughter of Caesar) (c. 76 BC–54 BC)
Livia Drusilla (58 BC–29 AD), also known as Julia Augusta, wife of Emperor Augustus Caesar
Julia the Elder (39 BC–14 AD), daughter of Emperor Augustus
Julia Livia (before 14–43), granddaughter of Emperor Tiberius
Julia Agrippina or Agrippina the Younger (15–59), daughter of the general Germanicus and fourth wife of Emperor Claudius
Julia Drusilla (16–38), daughter of Germanicus, sister of Caligula
Julia Livilla (18-late AD 41 or early AD 42), daughter of Germanicus, youngest sister of Caligula
Julia Drusilla (39–41), daughter of Emperor Caligula
Julia the Younger (actually Vipsania Julia, 19 BC–c. AD 29), daughter of Julia the Elder
Berenice (daughter of Herod Agrippa) (28–after 81), Julia Berenice, princess of the Herodian Dynasty
Julia Urania, wife of Roman client king Ptolemy of Mauretania
Julia Bodina, a slave, later freedwoman, of Julia Urania of Mauretania
Julia Procilla, mother of Gallo-Roman general Gnaeus Julius Agricola (40–93)
Julia Iotapa (daughter of Antiochus III) (before 17–c. 52), Queen of Commagene
Julia Iotapa (daughter of Antiochus IV) (c. 45–after 96), Queen of Cetis
Julia Iotapa (Cilician princess) (c. 80–2nd century), Princess of Cilicia
Julia Mamaea (wife of Polemon II of Pontus), second wife of Polemon II of Pontus
Julia (daughter of Tigranes VI of Armenia), Herodian Princess of Armenia
Julia Agricola (64–?), daughter of general Gnaeus Julius Agricola and wife to historian Tacitus
Julia Flavia (64–91), daughter of emperor Titus
Julia Balbilla (72–after 130), poet and companion of Hadrian's wife Vibia Sabina
Julia Tertulla, daughter of suffect consul Gaius Julius Cornutus Tertullus
Julia Serviana Paulina (died before 136?), niece of Emperor Hadrian
Julia Crispina, princess and granddaughter of Julia Berenice
Julia Fadilla, younger half-sister to Emperor Antoninus Pius and paternal aunt to Empress Faustina the Younger
Julia Domna (160–217), empress and wife of Emperor Septimius Severus
Julia Maesa (c. 165–c. 224), Domna's sister
Julia Soaemias (180–222), daughter to Julia Maesa and mother of emperor Elagabalus
Julia Avita Mamaea (after 180–235), Soaemias' sister and mother of emperor Alexander Severus
Julia Severa or Severina, daughter of Emperor Philip the Arab
One of the Martyrs of Zaragoza (died c. 303)
Julia of Mérida (died 304), martyr
Julia of Corsica (died on or after 439), virgin martyr

Modern world
 Danielle Julia Marcano (born 1997), American soccer player
 Julia Carter Aldrich (1834–1924), American author
 Júlia Almeida (born 1983), Brazilian actress
 Julia A. Ames (1816–1891), American journalist, editor and temperance reformer
 Julia Arthur (1869–1950), Canadian-born stage and film actress
 Julia Barretto (born 1997), Filipino actress
 Julia Bascom, 21st century American autism rights activist
 Julie Billiart (1751–1816), French Catholic saint
 Julia Boutros (born 1968), Lebanese singer
 Julia Budd (born 1983), Canadian martial artist
 Julia Abigail Fletcher Carney (1823–1908), American educator and poet
 Julia Child (1912–2004), American gourmet cook, author and television personality
 Julia Clarete (born 1979), Filipino singer and actress
 Julia Cohen (born 1989), American tennis player
 Julia Colman (1828–1909), American educator, activist, editor and writer
 Julia Pleasants Creswell (1827–1886), American poet and novelist
 Julia Dean (actress, born 1830) (1830–1868), American stage actress
 Julia Dean (actress, born 1878) (1878–1952), American stage and film actress
 Julia de Burgos (1914–1953), Puerto Rican poet
 Julia C. R. Dorr (1825–1913), American author
 Julia Dorsey (1850-1919), African-American suffragist
 Julia Duffy (born 1951), American actress
 Julia Duporty (born 1971), Cuban sprinter
 Julia Knowlton Dyer (1829–1927), American philanthropist
 Julia Fischer (born 1983), German violinist
 Julia Wheelock Freeman (1833–1900), American Civil War nurse
 Julia Gillard (born 1961), Australian politician, Prime Minister
 Julia Glushko (born 1990), Israeli tennis player
 Julia Goddard (1825–1896), British children's writer and animal welfare campaigner
 Julia Gordon, Canadian mathematician
 Julia Swayne Gordon (1878–1933), American actress
 Julia Görges (born 1988), German tennis player
 Julia Grant (1826–1902), wife of US President Ulysses Grant
 Julia Boynton Green (1861–1957), American poet
 Julia Hamburg (born 1986), German politician
 Julia Haworth (born 1979), British actress
 Julia Ward Howe (1819–1910), American abolitionist, social activist and poet
 Julia Hütter (born 1983), German pole vaulter
 Julia Ioffe (born 1982), Russian-born American journalist
 Julia Irwin (born 1951), Australian politician
 Julia Klöckner (born 1972), German politician
 Julia Kwan, Canadian screenwriter and director
 Julia Lathrop (1858–1932), American social reformer
 Julia Ledóchowska, birth name of Ursula Ledóchowska (1865–1939), Roman Catholic saint
 Julia Lennon (1914–1958), mother of John Lennon
 Julia Lipnitskaya (born 1998), Russian figure skater
 Julia Louis-Dreyfus (born 1961), American actress, co-star of the TV series Seinfeld
 Julia Mancuso (born 1984), American skier
 Julia Marlowe (1865–1950), English-born American actress
 Julia Harris May (1833–1912), American poet, teacher and school founder
 Julia E. McConaughy (1834–1885), American litterateur and author
 Julia Menéndez (born 1985), Spanish field hockey defender
 Julia Michaels (born 1993), American singer and songwriter
 Julia Montes (born 1995), Filipino-German actress
 Julia A. Moore (1847–1920), American poet
 Julia Morgan (1872–1957), American architect
 Julia Morton (1912–1996), American author and botanist
 Julia Murney (born 1969), American actress and singer
 Julia Nesheiwat, Arab-American US Army soldier and advisor
 Julia Newmeyer (born 1933), American actress better known as Julie Newmar
 Julia Nyberg (1784–1854), Swedish poet
 Julia Ormond (born 1965), British actress
 Julia Anna Orum (1843-1904), American educator, lecturer, and author
 Julia Perez (1980–2017), Indonesian actress, singer, presenter, model and comedian
 Julia Pérez Montes de Oca (1839–1875), Cuban poet
 Julia Phillips (1944–2002), American film producer and author
 Julia Piera (born 1970), Spanish poet
 Julia Jones Pugliese (1909–1993), American fencer and fencing coach
 Julia Rais (born 1971), Malaysian film actress and princess
 Julia Roberts (born 1967), American actress
 Julia Sakara (born 1969), Zimbabwean middle-distance runner
 Julia Sanderson (1888–1975), American actress and singer
 Julia Sawalha (born 1968), British actress
 Julia Schruff (born 1982), German retired tennis player
 Julia Stiles (born 1981), American actress
 Julia H. Scott (1809–1842), American poet
 Julia Sude (born 1987), German beach volleyball player
 Julia Sweeney (born 1959), American actor and comedian
 Julia Vakulenko (born 1983), Ukrainian tennis player
 Julia Rush Cutler Ward (1796–1824), American poet
 Julia Wells (born 1935), English actress, singer and author better known as Julie Andrews
 Julia Wilson (born 1978), Australian rower
 Julia Winter (born 1993), Swedish-British actress
 Julia A. Wood (1840–1927), American writer and composer
 Julia Amanda Sargent Wood (pen name, Minnie Mary Lee; 1825–1903), American author
 Julia McNair Wright (1840–1903), American writer
 Julia Evelyn Ditto Young (1857–1915), American novelist and poet

Fictional characters
Julia (Nineteen Eighty-Four), a character in Nineteen Eighty-Four by George Orwell
Julia (Rave Master), a character in manga series Rave Master
Julia (Sesame Street), a character with autism in the children's television series Sesame Street
Julia, a character in The Ragwitch by Garth Nix
Julia, a character in William Shakespeare's play Two Gentlemen of Verona
Julia, a character in the anime series Cowboy Bebop
Julia Chang, character in the Tekken video game series
Julia "Jules" Cobb, a character played by Courteney Cox on the comedy series Cougar Town
Julia Crichton, the female protagonist in Fullmetal Alchemist: The Sacred Star of Milos
Julia Fernandez, a character from the manga and anime Beyblade G-Revolutions
Julie "Finn" Finlay, a character played by Elisabeth Shue in CSI: Crime Scene Investigation
Julia Flyte, a character in Brideshead Revisited by Evelyn Waugh
Julia Graham, a character in the 2010 adaptation of Parenthood
Julia Houston, a character played by Debra Messing on the TV series Smash
Julia McNamara, a character on the U.S. television series Nip/Tuck
Julia Sugarbaker, a character in the sitcom Designing Women
Donna Julia, a character in the poem "Don Juan" by Lord Byron
Julia Ogden, a character in the Canadian television series Murdoch Mysteries
Julia Argent, a character from the Netflix series, Carmen Sandiego (TV series)
Julia Baker, a character from the 1960's television series, Julia (1968 TV series)

List of variants
Džūlija, Jūlija (Latvian)
Gillian (English)
Giulia (Italian)
Giuliana (Italian)
Giulietta (Italian)
Ίουλα, Íoula, Íula (Greek)
Ιουλία, Ioulía, Iulía (Greek)
Ιουλιέττα or Ιουλιέτα, Ioulietta/Ioulieta, Iulietta/Iulieta (Greek)
Iuliana, Iouliana (Ιουλιάνα) (Greek)
Iulianna, Ioulianna (Ιουλιάννα) (Greek)
Iúile (Irish)
Iulia (Bulgarian, Hawaiian, Romanian)
Iuliana (Romanian)
Jill (English)
Jillian (English)
Jovita (Spanish)
Jules (English)
Juli (Hungarian)
Júlia (Catalan, Hungarian, Portuguese, Slovak)
Júlía (Icelandic)
Juliana (Dutch, English, German, Portuguese, Spanish)
Juliane (French, German)
Julianna (English, Hungarian, Polish)
Julianne (English)
Julie (Czech, Danish, English, French, Norwegian)
Julienne (French)
Julienna (French)
Juliet (English)
Julia (Portuguese, Spanish)
Julieta, Julietta (Spanish)
Juliette (French)
Julija (Lithuanian, Serbo-Croatian, Macedonian, Slovene)
Jūlija (Latvian)
Julijana (Slovene)
Julinka (Hungarian)
Juliska (Hungarian)
Julcia, Julka, Julia (Polish)
Julitta (Dutch)
Juulia (Estonian, Finnish)
Uliana (Ульяна) (Russian)
Uliana, Uliyana (Уляна)  (Ukrainian)
Xhulia (Albanian)
Xhuliana (Albanian)
Xulia (Galician)
Xiana  (Galician)
Yulia (Юлия) (Russian)
Yuliia, Yuliya (Юлія) (Ukrainian)
Yuliana (Bulgarian, Russian)
Yuliya (Bulgarian, Russian)
Julija (Macedonian)

See also 
 Julian
 Julie (given name)
 Juliet (disambiguation)
 Julija, given name
 Yulia, given name
 Yuliya, given name

References 

Feminine given names
English feminine given names
Filipino feminine given names
German feminine given names
Greek feminine given names
Latin feminine given names
Polish feminine given names
Spanish feminine given names
Ukrainian feminine given names